The La Bañeza motorcycle races take place each August during the feast of the Annunciation of the Virgin Mary in Spain. They began in 1954 as a demonstration.

The circuit covers a large part of the town, but the paddock literally locks in the residents.

There are four bike classes at La Bañeza. Two are for modern bikes - pre-GP 125s and current GP 125s.

External links
 
 La Baneza Grand Prix (Spanish / English)

References

Motorsport competitions in Spain
Motorcycle races